The enzyme L-fuculose-phosphate aldolase catalyzes the chemical reaction

 L-fuculose-1-phosphate  glycerone phosphate + (S)-lactaldehyde

This enzyme belongs to the family of lyases, specifically the aldehyde-lyases, which cleave carbon-carbon bonds.  The systematic name of this enzyme class is L-fuculose-1-phosphate (S)-lactaldehyde-lyase (glycerone-phosphate-forming). Other names in common use include L-fuculose 1-phosphate aldolase, fuculose aldolase, and L-fuculose-1-phosphate lactaldehyde-lyase.  This enzyme participates in fructose and mannose metabolism.

Structural studies

See also 

 Fuculose
 L-Fuculose kinase

References

 
 
 

EC 4.1.2
Enzymes of known structure